Osnat Lubrani (Hebrew: אסנת לוברני) is an Israeli diplomat. She serves as the United Nations humanitarian coordinator in Ukraine.

Early life and education 
Osnat Lubrani is the daughter of Israeli diplomat Uri Lubrani. She earned a Masters in International Affairs from School of International and Public Affairs, Columbia University and a Masters in Film and Television Production from New York University.

Diplomatic career
Lubrani was Development Coordinator in Kosovo for the United Nations Development Programme (UNDP) as well as the UNDP Resident Representative beginning in November 2009.

Lubrani became the UN Humanitarian Coordinator in Ukraine in 2018. Prior to her service there, she was the Resident Coordinator for the Pacific. She has held conflict resolution posts with the United Nations in Kosovo and human rights and development positions in Zaire.

See also 

 2022 Russian invasion of Ukraine

References

United Nations officials
School of International and Public Affairs, Columbia University alumni
Living people
Tisch School of the Arts alumni
Israeli women diplomats
Year of birth missing (living people)